Ju'erbiesu was an empress of the Western Liao dynasty (Qara Khitai). She was with Yelü Zhilugu during his capture by Kuchlug in 1211. She was later honored as empress dowager by Kuchlug.

References 

Qara Khitai empresses